Mardana can refer to 
 Bhai Mardana, the companion of the founder of Sikhism
 Mardana, Madhya Pradesh, a village in India
 Mardana, the outer part (for guests and men) of a South Asian house, as opposed to the Zenana